Opanas Heorhiiovych Slastion (1855–1933) was a Ukrainian graphic artist, painter, and ethnographer.

He was born in the port town of Berdiansk (now Ukraine) on the Berdyansk Gulf of the Sea of Azov. He studied at the Imperial Academy of Arts in Saint Petersburg, Russia (where he was also known as Afanasy Slastyon), researched the Cossack documents in the archives of the Russian ministry of defense, and later worked as a teacher at the Arts and Crafts School (later renamed the State Ceramics Vocational School) in Myrhorod. A very gifted person, he perfected his talents in singing, bandura playing, ethnography, journalism, education, design, and architecture. Opanas Slastion was a true Ukrainian encyclopaedist.

Ukraine at the turn of the 19-20th centuries 

At the time Slastion was growing up, there were opportunities for some Ukrainians to have their talents recognized in the Imperial capital and in Western Europe. Many gifted Ukrainian performers joined court choirs and theatre, opera, and ballet troupes, and the Ukrainian artists were attracted to the Academy of Arts in St. Petersburg. In the 19th century among these Ukrainian artists was the famous poet and writer Taras Shevchenko, whose writings, etchings and paintings dedicated to Ukrainian ethnographic themes (genre scenes and portraits) greatly influenced Slastion, who became the first illustrator of Shevchenko's 'Kobzar' (the illustrations to "Haidamaky"). As a painter, Slastion is credited with depicting series of Cossack and kobzar portraits and scenes of Ukrainian country life.

Slastion and the kobzars 

Slastion was one of the most active propagators of the artistry of the kobzars. Actually, he himself was the first outstanding sighted bandura player and tutor of modern times. Kobzar Ivan Kuchuhura-Kucherenko stayed with him in Myrhorod in order to refine his performance of dumy (sung epic poems) under the guidance of Slastion. Danylo Pika, one of the founders of the Poltava Bandurist Capella (who became its conductor), initially learned to play the bandura from Slastion in Myrhorod. Later in his life, in the early 1930s, Slastion designed the shape of the standard Kyiv bandura (the familiar modern shape of the instrument). Some other instruments of the bandura family (such as those made by Ivan Skliar, for example) were also modeled on Slastion's designs.

Slastion the ethnographer 

Slastion was also a leading Ukrainian folklorist and ethnographer. In 1875, then a student at the Petersburg Academy of Arts and a budding folklorist, he spent his holidays in Ukraine and got the chance to know the artistry of the kobzar Nekhovaizub.

In 1876 P. Martynovych and his colleague Slastion travelled to Lokhvytsia and recorded the duma parody by kobzar Ivan Kravchenko. In 1887 Slastion made an engraving of kobzar P. Siroshtan.
In 1905 he painted a portrait of kobzar Pavlo Hashchenko and noted that Hashchenko knew four dumy.

In 1902-1903 he was one of the initiators of the idea of the preservation of kobzar music by means of sound recording using recently invented phonograph.

In 1906 Slastion met the kobzar Zhovniansky, recorded his performances of dumy, and painted his portrait.

In 1908 in Yalta the technically savvy Slastion helped Lesia Ukrainka and her husband Klyment Kvitka make live recordings (on phonograph cylinders) of the dumy performed by the blind virtuoso Hnat Honcharenko (circa 1837 - circa 1917), as part of the major project of the preservation of kobzar music. These recordings were transcribed by Filaret Kolessa, who later published them in his collection Melodiyi ukrayins'kykh narodnykh dum (The Melodies of the Ukrainian Folk Dumas). It is known that Slastion corresponded with another well-known blind kobzar, Tereshko Parkhomenko (1872–1910). In 1909 Slastion made recordings of the repertoire of kobzar Hovtan, including the duma "The Widow and Her Three Sons".

Selections from Slastion's repertoire originally recorded on wax cylinders can be found on a record released as a dedication to Lesya Ukrainka.

As an architect, Opanas Slastion was one of the founding fathers of the "Ukrainian Modern" style in architecture.

References 

 Portrety ukrains'kykh kobzariv (Portraits of the Ukrainian Kobzars). Slastion, Opanas. AN URSR. Kiev,1961
 CR - Dumy moyi - Surma ... Kobzar Opanas Slastion. R - Melodiya - D 029429-30 '100 richchia Lesi Ukrainky - (1909), Oleh Sozansky (Lviv)
 Melodiyi ukrayins'kykh narodnykh dum (The Melodies of Ukrainian Folk Dumas), 2 vol., 1910; reprinted in 1969.

External links 
 
 A. M. Abbasov. Opanas Slastion: Life and Work. Kyiv, Mistectvo, 1973.
 Illustrations of Ukrainian kobzars by Opanas Slastion
 Book of illustrations of Ukrainian kobzars by Opanas Slastion

1933 deaths
1855 births
Bandurists
Kobzarstvo
Ukrainian ethnographers
19th-century Ukrainian painters
19th-century Ukrainian male artists
Ukrainian male painters
20th-century Ukrainian painters
20th-century Ukrainian male artists